Forgotten One may refer to:

 Forgotten One (comics), a superhero in the Marvel Comics universe
 The Forgotten One, a sub-boss in the video game Warcraft III: The Frozen Throne
 The Forgotten One (film), a 1989 film